Lionel Hugh Harvey (born June 25, 1949) is a Canadian retired ice hockey forward who played 18 games in the National Hockey League for the Kansas City Scouts between 1974 and 1976. The rest of career, which lasted from 1969 to 1976, was mainly spent in the minor leagues.

Career statistics

Regular season and playoffs

External links
 

1949 births
Baltimore Clippers players
Canadian ice hockey forwards
Dayton Gems players
Fort Worth Texans players
Ice hockey people from Ontario
Hershey Bears players
Kansas City Scouts players
Living people
Oklahoma City Blazers (1965–1977) players
Sportspeople from Kingston, Ontario
Springfield Indians players
Undrafted National Hockey League players